Dobre may refer to:

People 
Dobre is a common family name in Romania

Aurelia Dobre, gymnast
Cornel Dobre, footballer
Dănuț Dobre, rower
Estera Dobre, wrestler
Gabriel Dobre, futsal player
Leonard Dobre, footballer
Lucian Dobre, footballer
Octavia Dobre, professor
Lucas and Marcus, both have the last name Dobre

Places in Poland
Dobre, Radziejów County in Kuyavian-Pomeranian Voivodeship (north-central Poland)
Dobre, Rypin County in Kuyavian-Pomeranian Voivodeship (north-central Poland)
Dobre, Lublin Voivodeship (east Poland)
Dobre, Masovian Voivodeship (east-central Poland)
Dobre, Lubusz Voivodeship (west Poland)
Dobre, West Pomeranian Voivodeship (north-west Poland)

See also 
 Dobra (disambiguation)
 Dobrin (disambiguation)
 Dobrușa (disambiguation)
 Dobrești (disambiguation)
 Dobrotești (disambiguation)
 Dobrescu (surname)
 Dobreni, name of several villages in Romania
 Dobreanu River (disambiguation)

Romanian-language surnames